Robot Wars is a 1993 American cyberpunk film directed by Albert Band and written by Charles Band and Jackson Barr. It tells the story of a hotshot mech pilot in a post-apocalyptic 2041 who must stop mech hijackers from provoking global war.

Plot 

By 2041, North America has been ravaged by "the great toxic gas scare of 1993": large swaths of land have been turned into inhospitable desert, where bands of raiders called "Centros" attack transports. The former United States have been assimilated into a Western bloc called the North Hemi. The opposing Eastern bloc is known as the Eastern Alliance, and the North Hemi is planning to salvage its economy by manufacturing defense robots called "mini-megs" for the Eastern Alliance. These robots would be half-sized offshoots of giant "mega-robots", once ubiquitous in warfare, but now reduced to a single specimen, the Mega-Robotic Assault System-2 (or MRAS-2, pronounced "Merras-2" for short in dialogue) which looks like a mechanized scorpion.

MRAS-2 conducts tours for civilians, and carries laser assault weapons and a magnetic shield ("mag-shield" for short in dialogue) to defend itself. It is operated by captain Drake and his copilot Stumpy. During a transport run, MRAS-2 is ambushed by Centros. Drake opts for a defensive strategy, but his boss Rooney, Chief of Operation in Op Com, orders him to attack so he can show off the robot to general Wa-Lee and his aide Chou-Sing, visiting dignitaries from the Eastern Alliance sent to negotiate the purchase of the mini-meg series. The violent rocking motions of MRAS-2 during the battle cause an archaeologist passenger, Dr. Leda Fanning, to drop and break her valuable specimens. When Drake brings MRAS-2 to port, Leda angrily confronts Drake about the specimens, but he dismisses her with flirtatious remarks.

Drake is summoned to Rooney's office, and shows him a recovered Centro weapon which appears to be of Eastern alliance origin. Drake deduces that the Eastern alliance is conspiring with the Centros, but Rooney disbelieves him. Drake pressures Rooney to stop the MRAS-2 tours to avoid risking more lives, and when his boss refuses, Drake vows to quit piloting the robot. Meanwhile, Leda has met with her journalist friend Annie, and exposes some suspicious activity going on in Crystal Vista, a perfectly preserved 20th-century town that was abandoned during the toxic gas scare: according to Leda, the town is built on a layer of "infasorb-8", a 21st-century material not invented when the town was abandoned, which is impenetrable to satellite imaging, and she has found components in an underground tunnel that are similar to those of the old MEGA-1 robot, which was supposedly dismantled.

Later, Wa-Lee holds a traditional fighting ceremony. During a break in the fighting, Chou-Sing draws Wa-Lee's attention to Drake sitting in the audience. Wa-Lee invites Drake, who apparently has long-standing animosity against him, to fight. Drake initially declines, but Wa-Lee insists. Drake relents, and knocks Wa-Lee down before the battle begins proper, cementing the tension between them. Drake then makes good on his promise to Rooney and gives up pilot duty to volunteer for a special op against the Centros; there he recovers more Eastern Alliance-manufactured equipment. Despite Drake's insistence that the MRAS-2 is under threat from Centros, Rooney allows the tour to proceed with replacement pilot, captain Boles, piloting MRAS-2, and even has Wa-Lee taught how to pilot the robot as a courtesy. At a bar later on, Stumpy tells Drake that his grandfather was part of an effort to hide pieces of the MEGA-1 before the salvagers got to it; when Drake asks how one would hide a mega-robot, Stumpy says, "I guess you don't... they got caught". Meanwhile, Leda and Annie have ridden the MRAS-2 to Crystal Vista. There, they go underground through the basement of a schoolhouse, and find the micron transponders of the MEGA-1. Annie returns to catch the MRAS-2 return trip, while Leda stays behind to continue the investigation.

Suddenly, Centros appear and chase Leda. She escapes for a while, and the rest of the Centros head for the Crystal Vista robot port. There, they join Wa-Lee's officers in a mutiny and kill the North Hemi security and captain Boles, proving Drake right about the Eastern Alliance's duplicity. Wa-Lee orders Chou-Sing to lock the passengers hostage in the MRAS-2 cabin and take control of Crystal Vista, while Wa-Lee hijacks MRAS-2 and attempts to destroy strategic targets, starting with the "toxic tomb", a pyramid-shaped structure used to store hazardous waste. Rooney pleads with Drake and Stumpy to retake the robot, and they agree upon learning that the Centros have captured Leda. Then Wa-Lee, upon hearing from his Centro allies that Drake has freed Leda and killed Chou-Sing, aborts his attack on the tomb and heads for Crystal Vista to kill Drake. To Wa-Lee's astonishment, he sees that Drake has found the MEGA-1 robot intact, reactivated it with Stumpy's expert help, and is now piloting it.

The two robots meet in the desert and begin fighting. Drake removes the MRAS-2's cabin, saving the passengers, and eventually manages to severely damage MRAS-2 and subdue the general. The film ends happily as Drake and Leda admit their attraction to each other.

Cast 
 Don Michael Paul as Captain Marion Drake
 Barbara Crampton as Dr. Leda Fanning
 James Staley as "Stumpy"
 Lisa Rinna as Annie
 Danny Kamekona as General Wa-Lee
 Yuji Okumoto as Chou-Sing
 J. Downing as Lieutenant Plunkett
 Peter Haskell as Chief Rooney
 Sam Scarber as Lieutenant Pritchard
 Steve Eastin as Captain Boles
 Burke Byrnes as Technician

Similarity to Robot Jox
It is sometimes referred to as a sequel to Robot Jox. However, while both films came from the same producer and have similar themes (giant robot battles), their storylines are unrelated. Of note is that the venerable actor Danny Kamekona plays different characters in each film.

Release 
Robot Wars was originally released on VHS by Paramount Home Video. It made its DVD debut in the 2007 box set Full Moon Classics: Volume Two. The film was also featured in the limited edition box set Full Moon Features: The Archive Collection, a 20th anniversary collection which featured 18 of Full Moon's most popular films. The film was released on DVD again by Shout! Factory on June 14, 2011, as a double feature DVD with Crash and Burn. The film was released on Blu-ray by Full Moon Features on December 15, 2017.

Robot Wars appeared as one of the first two episodes of the newest season of Mystery Science Theater 3000 in a Kickstarter livestream in May 2021.

References

External links 
 
 American Genre Film Archive page about the film 
 BFI

1993 films
1993 independent films
1990s science fiction action films
American independent films
American science fiction action films
American robot films
Films set in 2041
Films set in the future
Films shot in California
Full Moon Features films
American post-apocalyptic films
Films using stop-motion animation
Films directed by Albert Band
Mecha films
1990s English-language films
1990s American films